Albert "Al" Lawrence (born 26 April 1961) is a Jamaican former track and field athlete. He won a silver medal with the Jamaican team that consisted of Greg Meghoo, Don Quarrie and Ray Stewart.

References
 

1961 births
Living people
Jamaican male sprinters
Olympic athletes of Jamaica
Olympic silver medalists for Jamaica
Athletes (track and field) at the 1980 Summer Olympics
Athletes (track and field) at the 1984 Summer Olympics
Medalists at the 1984 Summer Olympics
Olympic silver medalists in athletics (track and field)
USA Indoor Track and Field Championships winners
20th-century Jamaican people
21st-century Jamaican people